Mathematics Magazine is a refereed bimonthly publication of the Mathematical Association of America. Its intended audience is teachers of collegiate mathematics, especially at the junior/senior level, and their students. It is explicitly a journal of mathematics rather than pedagogy. Rather than articles in the terse "theorem-proof" style of research journals, it seeks articles which provide a context for the mathematics they deliver, with examples, applications, illustrations, and historical background. Paid circulation in 2008 was 9,500 and total circulation was 10,000.

Mathematics Magazine is a continuation of Mathematics News Letter (1926–1934) and National Mathematics Magazine (1934–1945). Doris Schattschneider became the first female editor of Mathematics Magazine in 1981.  

The MAA gives the Carl B. Allendoerfer Awards annually "for articles of expository excellence" published in Mathematics Magazine.

See also
American Mathematical Monthly
 Carl B. Allendoerfer Award

Notes

Further reading

External links

Mathematics Magazine at JSTOR
Mathematics Magazine at Taylor & Francis Online

Mathematics education journals
Academic journals published by learned and professional societies of the United States
Mathematical Association of America